Ghulam Shabbir (born 25 April 1974) is a Pakistani boxer. He competed in the men's light welterweight event at the 2000 Summer Olympics.

References

External links
 

1974 births
Living people
Pakistani male boxers
Olympic boxers of Pakistan
Boxers at the 2000 Summer Olympics
Place of birth missing (living people)
Light-welterweight boxers